El-Hawa or Al-Hawa may refer to:

Wadi el-Hawa, Golan Heights
Qubbet el-Hawa, a site on the western bank of the Nile
Alia Abu El Hawa,  American-born Jordanian footballer
Al-Hawa, Syria
Dayr al-Hawa, a depopulated Palestinian Arab village 
Tel al-Hawa
Batn al-Hawa

See also
Bab al-Hawa Syria-Turkey Border Crossing
Kawkab al-Hawa

Hawa (disambiguation)